Roksana Yasmin Suty is a Bangladesh Awami League politician and the former Member of Bangladesh Parliament from a reserved seat.

Early life
Suty was born on 24 April 1959 and she has a B.A. degree.

Career
Suty was elected to parliament from reserved seat as a Bangladesh Awami League candidate in 2014. She was member of the Parliamentarians Caucus.

References

Awami League politicians
Living people
1959 births
Women members of the Jatiya Sangsad
10th Jatiya Sangsad members
21st-century Bangladeshi women politicians
21st-century Bangladeshi politicians